Stormy Marmot is a yellow-bellied marmot of the Rocky Mountain region, living in Aurora, Colorado.  Every February 2, on Groundhog Day, Stormy makes a prediction for the remainder of winter.

History
Stormy is a yellow-bellied marmot, a member of the squirrel family.  He is one of the few famous groundhogs west of the Mississippi.  Stormy is trotted out once a year to check for his shadow and make a weather prediction.

Concrete Driveway in Colorado claims to rely on Stormy's forecasts to prepare their fleet.

Punxsutawney Phil loyalists have been known to disparage Stormy.

Flatiron Freddy also represents Groundhog Day prognostication in Colorado.  He makes his home at Chautauqua Park in Boulder, CO.

Past predictions

Accuracy
Statistical analysis of groundhog predictions show that Stormy Marmot and Poor Richard (a groundhog based in York, Pennsylvania) have the best correlation to observed weather trends.  "When Stormy Marmot predicts an early spring, we can expect March to be on average 6 °F warmer, and April to be 2.5 °F warmer. When Poor Richard predicts an early spring, we can expect February to be 4 °F warmer and March to be 8 °F warmer." Dover Doug, a groundhog from Dover, Pennsylvania, was also noted for having a strong correlation between the sign of his shadow and the arrival of spring conditions.

According to analysis by FiveThirtyEight, Stormy has a 70% prediction accuracy in his own region, tied by General Beauregard Lee for the southeast and beaten only by Snohomish Slew, a bullfrog in the northwest, who has an 80% accuracy. Punxsutawney Phil only scored 50% for his region, the northeast.

Background
Punxsutawney Phil has been making predictions since the 1880s. However, this method of prognostication did not gain mass notoriety until the release of the 1993 comedy Groundhog Day (film) with Bill Murray and Andie MacDowell.  The movie became the 13th highest grossing of the year, with over $70 million at the box office. Over time, the movie became a cult classic and significantly increased awareness and attendance at Groundhog Day events.

See also
Groundhog Day
Balzac Billy
Buckeye Chuck
Fred la marmotte
General Beauregard Lee
Punxsutawney Phil
Shubenacadie Sam
Staten Island Chuck
Wiarton Willie

References

External links
 Stormy Marmot's website
 Stormy Marmot's blog

February observances
Public holidays in the United States
Colorado culture
Weather lore
Individual groundhogs
Holiday characters
Oracular animals
Groundhog Day